The Society for Romanian Studies (SRS), founded in 1973, is an international inter-disciplinary academic organization dedicated to Romanian studies. It draws its members – junior and senior scholars, graduate students, and government experts – primarily from North America, Romania, the Republic of Moldova and Western Europe. Through its activities, the SRS wishes to facilitate academic exchange within and across a multitude of disciplines, including history, sociology, geography, anthropology and ethnography, political science, philosophy, law and justice studies, literature and linguistics, economics and business, international affairs, religious, gender, film and media studies, art history, music and education. The society understands Romanian studies broadly to encompass political, socioeconomic and cultural developments in Romania and the Republic of Moldova, the situation of their ethnic minorities and their relations with the ethnic majority, as well as the position of Romanians and Moldovans living outside those countries.

Activities 
The society holds its Annual General Meeting at the annual conference of the Association for Slavic, East European, and Eurasian Studies (ASEEES), organized in late November in the United States. At that time, the Society also offers an annual graduate student essay prize for an outstanding unpublished essay or thesis chapter written in English by a graduate student and a biennial bok award to the best single-authored scholarly title published in English in any social science or humanities discipline on a Romanian studies topic. SRS members also attend conferences organized by different universities and other scholarly associations.

Since 1986, the society has held seven well-attended international congresses gathering Romanian studies scholars from a variety of countries. The First International Congress was held at the Sorbonne in Paris in 1986 with the help of Asociatia Internationala de Studii Romanesti. It was decided to organize these international meetings in Romania. Subsequent congresses were then held in Iași in 1993, Cluj in 1997, Suceava in 2001, Constanța in 2007 and Sibiu in 2012. The seventh congress was held in Bucharest on June 17–19, 2015, hosted by the Faculty of Political Science at the University of Bucharest.

In 2013, the society launched a book collection in partnership with Polirom, Romania’s largest publisher of academic titles. Co-ordinated by Irina Livezeanu and Lavinia Stan, the Studii Româneşti/Romanian Studies/Études Roumaines/Rumänische Studien series publishes scholarly books in Romanian written or edited by SRS members. It considers for publication Romanian translations of scholarly monographs already published in a foreign language, original scholarly monographs written in Romanian, and edited collections of Romanian-language essays dealing with a unifying theme. Book proposals must deal with Romania and/or Moldova and the populations living on their territories or with the Romanian and Moldovan diasporas and cultures, and they must have primarily an academic profile. Contributions may have a disciplinary, interdisciplinary or multidisciplinary focus, drawing on history, political science, sociology, anthropology, law, economics, linguistics, literature, art history and other fields.

The American Historical Association and the American Political Science Association are some of the scholarly organizations with which the SRS is affiliated. The society has joint-membership arrangements with the South East European Studies Association (SEESA), as well as the Romanian Studies Association of America (RSAA). Recently, the society has welcomed the Faculty of Political Science at the University of Bucharest, the Bucharest Academy of Economic Studies, and CEPOS at the University of Craiova among its organizational members.

Presidents of the Society for Romanian Studies 
 Stephen Fischer-Galati, 1978–1980
 Mary Ellen Fischer, 1981–1982
 Rodica Botoman, 1983–1984
 Walter M. Bacon, Jr., 1985–1986
 Earl A. Pope, 1987–1988
 Barbara Jelavich, 1989–1990
 George R. Ursul, 1991–1993
 Joseph Harrington, 1994–1996
 Paul D. Quinlan, 1997–2000
 James Augerot, 2001–2005
 Paul E. Michelson, 2006–2009
 Irina Livezeanu, 2010–2013
 Lavinia Stan, 2014–present

References

External links
Society for Romanian Studies

Organizations established in 1973
Academic organizations based in the United States
European studies
Romanian culture
Romanian-American culture